Banque Nationale (French for : "National bank") may refer to:

Banque Nationale Agricole, state-controlled bank in Tunisia
BNP Paribas (Banque Nationale de Paris), commercial bank
National Bank of Canada (Banque Nationale du Canada), commercial bank
Banque Nationale was the first name of Banque Canadienne Nationale, later amalgamated into National Bank of Canada
National Bank of Belgium (Banque Nationale de Belgique), central bank
Swiss National Bank (Banque Nationale de Suisse), central bank

See also
 National bank (disambiguation)